Baetidae is a family of mayflies with about 1000 described species in 110 genera distributed worldwide. These are among the smallest of mayflies, adults rarely exceeding 10 mm in length excluding the two long slender tails and sometimes much smaller, and members of the family are often referred to as small mayflies or small minnow mayflies. Most species have long oval forewings with very few cross veins (see Comstock-Needham system) but the hindwings are usually very small or even absent. The males often have very large eyes, shaped like turrets above the head (this is known as "turbinate condition").

Baetids breed in a wide range of waters from lakes and streams to ditches and even water butts. The nymphs are strong swimmers and feed mainly on algae.

The oldest members of the family date to the Late Cretaceous, with Myanmarella and Vetuformosa known from the Cenomanian aged Burmese amber, and Palaeocloeon from the Santonian aged Taimyr amber.

See also
 List of Baetidae genera

References

 Chinery, Michael Collins Guide to the Insects of Britain and Western Europe 1986 (Reprinted 1991)
 McGavin, George C. Insects and Spiders 2004
 Fauna Europaea
 Nomina Insecta Nearctica
 

Mayflies
Insect families